Anja Ninasdotter Abusland (born 25 November 1995) is a Norwegian politician for the Centre Party. She has been member of the Storting since 2021.

Political career
Abusland was a member of the municipal council of Songdalen from 2015 to 2019, and of the municipal council of Kristiansand from 2019. She was elected representative to the Storting from the constituency of Vest-Agder for the period 2021–2025, for the Centre Party. In the Storting, she has been a member of the Standing Committee on Labour and Social Affairs since 2021.

Early and personal life
Abusland hails from Finsland, and is educated as nurse. She gave birth to a daughter in 2021, shortly before she was elected representative to the Storting.

References

1995 births
Living people
Centre Party (Norway) politicians
Vest-Agder politicians
Members of the Storting
Women members of the Storting